Kamran Rashid Khan, known professionally as Lazarus, is a Detroit-based American rapper, songwriter and physician of Pakistani descent. He is known for his singles "GODFLOW", "Break the Walls" and "Man on a Mission" along with his songs "Drug of Choice", "Open Heart Surgery", "Underdog", "MTBK" and "Decapitation Chamber" featuring Nusrat Fateh Ali Khan, Bizarre, Royce da 5'9", Bohemia and Ghostface Killah respectively.

Early life
Khan was born in Detroit, Michigan to a Muslim family from Pakistan. He attended Wayne State University where he received a Bachelor's degree in Biological Sciences and subsequently Michigan State University College of Human Medicine where he studied medicine and obtained his medical degree in 2010. He further specialized in Hospital Medicine.

Career

2000–05: Career beginnings
While studying medicine, Lazarus simultaneously built a career in hip hop. He started rapping without a stage name but later changed his name to Lazarus due to hate crimes and racial stereotyping. He told in an interview to The Source magazine that after 9/11 he felt that his chances of becoming a rapper were finished and that his stage name metaphors the biblical character that was resurrected from the dead.

Lazarus started freestyle rapping on radio stations in Detroit. He won many rap battles on FM 95.5 and FM 105.9. His singles were also played on FM 98. Lazarus then started making mixtapes and performing at venues in Detroit including opening up for G-Unit and D12. In 2005, he was interviewed by Discovery Channel and was featured in the documentary titled “The Real 8 Mile,” which was hosted by Charlie LeDuff.

2007–11: Debut album and mixtape
Lazarus released his debut album Chapter One: The Prince Who Would Be King in 2007 which led to receive him three nominations "Lyricist of the Year", "Song of the Year" and "Artist of the Year" at the 2007 Detroit Hip Hop Awards. The album had 18 tracks including a featured track with Royce da 5'9". The album spawned the single "Let the Game Know". The single received over a million views on YouTube and its music video was directed by Anthony Garth. Another music video of the single "Drug of Choice" from his mixtape Lazarus Story (2010) received worldwide coverage and also gained over a million views on YouTube. It was filmed in Rawalpindi, Pakistan.

2013–2015: All Def Digital and collaborations
In 2013, Lazarus signed to Russell Simmons' YouTube multi-channel network All Def Digital and in 2014 he released the single "Open Heart Surgery" featuring D12's rapper Bizarre. It won the award for "Song of the Year" at the 12th Underground Music Awards in New York City. Lazarus then released his single "Underdog" featuring Royce da 5'9" in July 2015. The track was introduced by Chuck D of Public Enemy. In October 2015, he opened up  for Ludacris at his concert in Dallas, Texas. He was also featured on the song "Raw As It Gets" from D12's 2015 mixtape Devil's Night. The mixtape was introduced by Eminem and promoted by Shady Records.

2016–2018: Laz Army Records 
In January 2016, Lazarus released the track "Fearless" featuring Crooked I in which he criticized Donald Trump. The song included the verse: "Donald wants my arm embedded, Muslims cannot stay here. Now I'm feeling like a mutant but am I Magnus or Xavier?" In an interview with Examiner.com, he said regarding this verse: "It's like the comic book X-Men. As silly as it may sound, Muslims are the new mutants of today's society. Senator Kelly in the X-Men and Donald Trump are basically saying the same thing. There is supposed violence taking place by Muslims somewhere, now we must propose a ban on them all." Lazarus released the music video of "Underdog" featuring Royce da 5'9" in February 2016 under All Def Digital.
The music video of "Raw As It Gets" from D12's mixtape Devil's Night was released in August 2016.

In January 2017, Lazarus and Punjabi rapper Bohemia released their collaborative track "MTBK" ("Mundian To Bach Ke") featuring Deep Jandu and Shaxe Oriah. The single was produced by Kali Denali Music as a tribute to the late Labh Janjua and its music video crossed 4 million views on YouTube. His next single "Man on a Mission" produced by Dub Muzik was released in August 2017. DesiHipHop.com reviewed it positively saying "Lazarus just dropped his most creative song to date." The music video for the song was produced, edited and directed by Lazarus himself. It was released under his independent record company Laz Army Records and reached over a million views on YouTube. Lazarus toured Pakistan in October 2017 and then released his next video "Pakistan" in November 2017 in which he rapped about the country in the Urdu language and dedicated it to the well renowned Pakistani poet Allama Iqbal on his birthday. In December 2017, Lazarus celebrated the 10 year anniversary of his highly received 2007 track "GODFLOW" by releasing a music video for it. The video was shot in Lahore, Pakistan and produced by the visual effects team of Muhammad Shah. The song featured 100 bars of lyrics and was produced by Alpha-Bet. It was released on New Year's Eve under Laz Army Records and attained over a million views on YouTube on its first week of release.

In March 2018, Lazarus was featured on the track "Raindrops" alongside Royce da 5'9", Obie Trice and Swifty McVay of D12 on the mixtape No Parachute. The song was produced by Dub Muzik and introduced by Chuck D. Then in July 2018, Lazarus dropped the song "Decapitation Chamber" featuring Ghostface Killah of the Wu-Tang Clan. The song was produced by Rebel of KhanArtists and introduced by Chuck D. Lazarus toured with Ghostface Killah in Canada to perform the single. The song was also awarded a plaque for having reached 5 million downloads off the Wu-Invasion Mixtape it was featured on hosted by Ghostface Killah and DJ Symphony. In August 2018, Lazarus performed alongside Swifty McVay of D12 and Obie Trice in Pontiac, Michigan to promote the soundtrack of Devil's Night: Dawn of the Nain Rouge. Lazarus was featured on the soundtrack on the song titled "It's Coming". Lazarus also performed on the 'Shady Gang National Tour' alongside Swifty McVay, Obie Trice and Crooked I. In October 2018, Lazarus released the music video of "Decapitation Chamber" with Ghostface Killah and then toured with him in Vancouver, Canada and San Francisco, California. He then toured with the collective Wu-Tang Clan in Washington DC and Boston, Massachusetts followed by concerts in Australia and New Zealand. The music video of "Decapitation Chamber" crossed over a million views on YouTube.

2019-Present: Wu-Tang Clan tour and treating COVID-19 
In January 2019, Lazarus was interviewed on 50 Cent's radio station ThisIs50 by DJ Thoro. He then opened up for Wu-Tang Clan on 2 sold out shows in Philadelphia followed by 2 sold out shows in New York City which were hosted by Funkmaster Flex. He continued touring with Wu-Tang Clan in Detroit, Cleveland, Raleigh, Seattle and Tucson. In July 2019, Lazarus was interviewed on Eminem's radio station Shade 45. He was then featured by Bizarre on the song "Leatherface" alongside King Gordy & Hopsin which was released on Halloween.

In January 2020, Lazarus released his single "You Already Know" featuring Rick Ross & Gucci Mane. He then went on a USA tour with GZA of Wu-Tang Clan. In February 2020, Lazarus released his single "Break the Walls" featuring female vocalist Legha. The song was aimed at uniting people of all ethnicities and racial backgrounds. It was produced by Dr Zeus and received over 2 million views on YouTube. In April 2020, Lazarus was interviewed by DJ Vlad on VladTV to discuss his experiences as a physician on the front lines of combating COVID-19 at his hospital in Las Vegas. In May 2020, he was interviewed by DJ Vlad again and also appeared on the song "Fit In" by 80 Empire which also featured Fred the Godson & Bishop Lamont. In September 2020, Lazarus released his single "Medical Marijuana" featuring Redman in which he rapped about the medical benefits of cannabis.

In January 2021, Lazarus was featured by Locksmith on the lyrical back and forth anthem "Signs." After the song was released, Lazarus was interviewed by Fat Joe on his podcast The Big Big Show. He was also featured on Cassidy's album Da Wiseman on the song "Can't Do It Alone." The video for this song was premiered on Worldstar and received over a million views. Lazarus then released his full Urdu track "Qatal" and "Bande Kharab" featuring 10-year-old Pakistani rapper Kaky Thou$and on Laz Army Records. In August 2021, Lazarus dropped the theme song for WWE wrestler Jinder Mahal for his SummerSlam 2021 PPV match up. The song featured Raftaar, Manj Musik and Sikander Kahlon and crossed over 5 million views on YouTube.

Awards and nominations

|-
| style="text-align:center;"|2015
| rowspan="1" style="text-align:center;"|Open Heart Surgery
| Underground Music Award for 'Song of the Year'
|
|-
| style="text-align:center;"|2015
| rowspan="1" style="text-align:center;"|Lazarus
| Underground Music Award for 'Artist of the Year'
|
|-
| style="text-align:center;"|2018
| rowspan="1" style="text-align:center;"|Decapitation Chamber
| Platinum Plaque for 5 Million Downloads
|

Discography

Albums

Singles

Guest appearances

See also
List of Pakistani Americans
Pakistani hip hop

References

External links

Living people
American Muslims
American physicians of Pakistani descent
Date of birth missing (living people)
Michigan State University alumni
Physicians from Michigan
Rappers from Detroit
Songwriters from Michigan
Wayne State University alumni
American musicians of Pakistani descent
21st-century American rappers
Year of birth missing (living people)